Mwatebu is an Austronesian language spoken in a single village in the D'Entrecasteaux Islands of Papua New Guinea. It is spoken in the single village of Mwatebu in Duau Rural LLG, Milne Bay Province.

References 

Definitely endangered languages
Nuclear Papuan Tip languages
Languages of Milne Bay Province
D'Entrecasteaux Islands